Salai Leishangthem or Salang Leishangthem (modern term) or Chenglei is one of the seven clans of the Meitei people.
Salai Leishangthem consists of many several Yumnaks which are native peoples of ancient Kangleipak (now Manipur), one of the states of India.

See also
Mangang
Luwang
Khuman
Angom
Kha Nganpa
Moilang

References

Clans of Meitei